The following is a list of the about 98 Panaeolus mushroom species:

 Panaeolus acidus
 Panaeolus acuminatus
 Panaeolus affinis
 Panaeolus africanus, psychoactive
 Panaeolus albellus
 Panaeolus albidocinereus
 Panaeolus albovelutinus
 Panaeolus alcis
 Panaeolus alveolatus
 Panaeolus annulatus
 Panaeolus anomalus
 Panaeolus antillarum 
 Panaeolus atomatus 
 Panaeolus atrobalteatus
 Panaeolus axfordii, psychoactive
 Panaeolus bernicis
 Panaeolus bisporus, psychoactive
 Panaeolus bolombensis
 Panaeolus bubalorum
 Panaeolus cambodginiensis, psychoactive
 Panaeolus campanulatus (=Panaeolus papilionaceus accepted name)
 Panaeolus campanuloides
 Panaeolus castaneifolius (=Panaeolus olivaceus accepted name), psychoactive
 Panaeolus cinctulus (Bolton) Britzelm., psychoactive
 Panaeolus chlorocystis
 Panaeolus cinereofuscus
 Panaeolus clelandii
 Panaeolus conicodiffractus
 Panaeolus convexulus
 Panaeolus cyanescens, psychoactive
 Panaeolus deviellus
 Panaeolus diffractus
 Panaeolus digressus
 Panaeolus eburneus
 Panaeolus epimyces
 Panaeolus expromptus
 Panaeolus exsignatus
 Panaeolus fimbriatus
 Panaeolus fimicola, psychoactive compounds in small amounts
 Panaeolus fimicoloides
 Panaeolus fimiputris
 Panaeolus foenisecii
 Panaeolus fontinalis
 Panaeolus fraxinophilus
 Panaeolus georgii
 Panaeolus gomphodes
 Panaeolus goossensiae
 Panaeolus griseofibrillosus
 Panaeolus guttulatus
 Panaeolus hippophilus
 Panaeolus hygrophanus
 Panaeolus hypomelas
 Panaeolus incanus
 Panaeolus indicus
 Panaeolus intermedius
 Panaeolus lentisporus
 Panaeolus lerchenfeldii
 Panaeolus leucophanes
 Panaeolus lignicola
 Panaeolus linnaeanus
 Panaeolus longiguus
 Panaeolus microsporus Ola'h & Cailleux, psychoactive
 Panaeolus moellerianus Singer, psychoactive
 Panaeolus niveus
 Panaeolus obtusisporus
 Panaeolus olivaceofuscus
 Panaeolus olivaceus F.H. Møller, psychoactive
 Panaeolus ovatus
 Panaeolus paludosus
 Panaeolus panaiensis
 Panaeolus papilionaceus
 Panaeolus papilionaceus var. papilionaceus (Bull.) Quél., psychoactive
 Panaeolus pseudopapilionaceus Panaeolus pumilus Panaeolus pusillus Panaeolus queletii Panaeolus refellens Panaeolus regis Panaeolus remotus Panaeolus remyi Panaeolus reticulatus Panaeolus retirugis, (Fr.) Quél. (=Panaeolus papilionaceus accepted name)
 Panaeolus rubricaulis Panaeolus rufus Panaeolus semiglobatus Panaeolus semilanceatus Panaeolus semiovatus Panaeolus semiovatus var. phalaenarum Panaeolus semiovatus var. semiovatus P. sepulchralis P. solidipes, edible
 P. sphinctrinus (=Panaeolus papilionaceus accepted name)
 P. squamulosus Panaeolus subbalteatus (=Panaeolus cinctulus), psychoactive
 P. subditus P. subfirmus P. teutonicus P. texensis P. tirunelveliensis P. tropicalis, psychoactive
 P. uliginicola P. uliginosus P. variabilis P. venenosus P. venezolanus P. westii''

References

Entheogens
Panaeolus
Psychoactive fungi
Psychedelic tryptamine carriers